William Otto Brunner (7 July 1878 – 1 December 1958) was a Swiss astronomer.

From 1926 until 1945 he was the director of the Swiss Federal Observatory. He continued the series of Zurich sunspot observations that was begun in 1864 by the observatory founder, Rudolf Wolf. (These observations continue up to the present.)

The crater Brunner on the Moon is named after him.

Bibliography
 Brunner, William, "Die Welt der Sterne", Zurich, 1947.
 Brunner, William, "Vom Sternenhimmel", Erlenbach-Zurich, E. Rentsch, 1940.
 Brunner William, "Contributions to the photometry of night sky", Zurich, 1935.
 Brunner, William, "Anzeige des Todes von Alfred Wolfer", Astronomische Nachrichten, volume 243, 1931.
 Brunner, William, "Helligkeitsmessungen von Nova 60.1927 Aquilae", Astronomische Nachrichten, volume 230, 1927.
 Brunner, William, "Dreht sich die erde?", Leipzig und Berlin, B. G. Teubner, 1915.

1878 births
1958 deaths
20th-century Swiss astronomers